The 2015–16 UC Santa Barbara Gauchos men's basketball team represented the University of California, Santa Barbara during the 2015–16 NCAA Division I men's basketball season. The Gauchos, led by 18th year head coach Bob Williams, played their home games at the UC Santa Barbara Events Center, nicknamed the Thunderdome, as members of the Big West Conference. They finished the season 19–14, 11–5 in Big West play to finish in fourth place. They defeated UC Davis in the quarterfinals of the Big West tournament to advance to the semifinals where they lost to Hawaii. They were invited to the inaugural Vegas 16, which only had eight teams, where they defeated Northern Illinois to advance to the semifinals where they lost to Old Dominion.

Roster

Schedule and results
Source:

|-
!colspan=9 style="background:#1D1160; color:#FBCB55;"| Exhibition game

|-
!colspan=9 style="background:#1D1160; color:#FBCB55;"| Non-conference games

|-
!colspan=9 style="background:#1D1160; color:#FBCB55;"| Conference games

|-
!colspan=9 style="background:#1D1160; color:#FBCB55;"| Big West tournament

|-
!colspan=9 style="background:#1D1160; color:#FBCB55;"| Vegas 16

References

UC Santa Barbara Gauchos men's basketball seasons
UC Santa Barbara
UC Santa Barbara Gauchos men's basketball team
UC Santa Barbara Gauchos men's basketball team
UC Santa Barbara